Carlton Wilborn (born 1964) is an American dancer, actor, author and motivational speaker. He first gained global attention as a principal dancer for Madonna's Blond Ambition World Tour and The Girlie Show World Tour, and appeared in Madonna's Blond Ambition Tour documentary Madonna: Truth or Dare.

Early life 
Wilborn grew up in Chicago. He began his performing career at Whitney M. Young Magnet High School, where he was in dance classes with Michelle Obama.

Career 
After high school, he eventually became a principal dancer in Hubbard Street Dance Chicago. Carlton is one of seven dancers from the Madonna 1990 Blond Ambition World Tour reunion 2016 documentary, Strike a Pose.

Filmography

Film

Television

References

1964 births
Living people
American male dancers
American motivational speakers
Male actors from Chicago
Place of birth missing (living people)